The Street family is an Australian dynasty, founded by the banker and politician John Street and his wife Susanna, the daughter of Australian explorer Commandant William Lawson. Their son Sir Philip Whistler Street, grandson Lieutenant-Colonel Sir Kenneth Whistler Street, and great-grandson Colonel Sir Laurence Whistler Street served as Chief Justice of the Supreme Court of New South Wales and Lieutenant-Governor of New South Wales. Sir Kenneth's wife Lady "Red Jessie" Street was Australia's first female delegate to the United Nations and his cousin Brigadier Geoffrey Street was Minister of Defence in World War II, as well as the father of Anthony "Tony" Street, who was Minister of Foreign Affairs. Sir Laurence's son Commander Alexander "Sandy" Street, daughter Lieutenant-Commander Sylvia Emmett (née Street) and son-in-law Professor Arthur Emmett serve as federal judges.

1st generation

John Rendell Street,  (1832–1891) was an Australian banker and politician, born to Maria Wood and John Street, descendent of Baron Sir Thomas Street, an English Chief Justice who sat on the last King's Bench before the Glorious Revolution of 1688. Both parents were English émigrés to Australia via the 1822 passenger ship Thalia. In 1886, John founded the Perpetual Trustee Company with fellow trustees Edmund Barton and James Fairfax. He succeeded Edmund Barton, Australia's 1st Prime Minister, in his New South Wales Legislative Assembly seat of East Sydney. John married Susanna Lawson, the daughter of William Lawson, an Australian explorer who along with William Wentworth and Gregory Blaxland pioneered the first settler crossing of the Blue Mountains in 1813. John and Susanna had seven children, including Philip and Ernest, who married Emma Browne, the daughter of Australian author Thomas Browne. John was a director of the Colonial Mutual Life Assurance Company (now Commonwealth Bank). His sister Sarah married Thomas Smith, managing director of the Commercial Banking Company of Sydney (now National Australia Bank).

2nd generation

 
Sir Philip Whistler Street,  (1863–1938) was the 8th Chief Justice of the Supreme Court of New South Wales and Lieutenant-Governor of New South Wales. On 11 February 1907, he became a full judge of the Supreme Court of New South Wales. He became Chief Justice of the Supreme Court on 28 January 1925 and held that office until his 70th birthday in 1933. He became Lieutenant-Governor of New South Wales in 1930, and administered the state in the absence of the Governor from May to October 1934, January to February 1935, and January to August 1936. He died in 1938 and was buried with a state funeral. He is the second longest serving judge in New South Wales history. His second son Laurence died fighting in the Gallipoli campaign and his eldest son Kenneth succeeded him as Chief Justice.

3rd generation

Lieutenant Laurence Whistler Street (1894–1915) was 21 when he was killed in action in May 1915 while fighting in the Gallipoli campaign. A student of Sydney Law School, he enlisted in the Australian Army in August 1914, among the first of his generation, and was made an officer of the 3rd Battalion of the 1st Infantry Brigade.

Lieutenant-Colonel Sir Kenneth Whistler Street,  (1890–1972) was the 10th Chief Justice of the Supreme Court of New South Wales and Lieutenant-Governor of New South Wales. He was elevated as a judge of the Supreme Court on 7 October 1931, thus joining the bench of which his father was then Chief Justice. According to Percival Serle, this is the only known case in Australian history of a father and a son sitting together as judges on the same bench. Sir Kenneth was sworn in as Chief Justice of the Supreme Court of New South Wales on 7 February 1950. He was Lieutenant-Governor of New South Wales from 1950 to 1972. Prior to his career as a judge, he served in the First World War, having been commissioned on 29 September 1914 in the Duke of Cornwall's Light Infantry and sent to France. He retried with the rank of lieutenant colonel in the Citizens Military Force and was buried with a state funeral at St Andrew's Cathedral, Sydney. Street House at Cranbrook School, Sydney is named in his honour. Sir Kenneth married Jessie Mary Grey Lillingston and their children were named Laurence, Belinda, Philippa and Roger.
 

Jessie Mary Grey, Lady Street (née Lillingston; 1889–1970) was a diplomat and suffragette, dubbed "Red Jessie" by the media. She was the daughter of Charles Alfred Gordon Lillingston,  (great-grandson of Sir George Grey, 1st Baronet) and Mabel Harriet Ogilvie, the daughter of Australian politician Edward David Stuart Ogilvie, . She was a tireless campaigner for human rights, from the women's suffrage struggle in England to the removal of Australia's constitutional discrimination against Aboriginal people in 1967. Jessie was Australia's only female delegate to the San Francisco Conference in 1945, where she played a key role in ensuring that gender was included as a non-discrimination clause, in addition to race and religion, in the United Nations Charter. The Jessie Street Centre, the Jessie Street Trust, the Jessie Street National Women's Library and the Jessie Street Gardens exist in her honour.

Brigadier Geoffrey Austin Street,  (1894–1940) was a cousin of Sir Kenneth's who served as Australia's Minister of Defence in the First Menzies Government during the Second World War. He was awarded a Military Cross for his courage in serving the Australian Imperial Force during the Gallipoli campaign, where he was wounded before returning to service in France during the First World War. At the request of his friend Robert Menzies, he stood for and won the seat of Corangamite in 1934. He was made Minister of Defence in November 1938 and played a major role in the expansion of the military and munitions prior to the outbreak of the Second World War and pushed the National Registration Act (1939) through parliament despite strong opposition, before dying in the 1940 Canberra air disaster. His son Tony Street succeeded him in the seat of Corangamite.

4th generation

Colonel Sir Laurence Whistler Street,  (1926–2018) was the 14th Chief Justice of the Supreme Court of New South Wales and Lieutenant-Governor of New South Wales. He became Chief Justice and Lieutenant-Governor in 1974, the youngest since 1844. He had joined the Royal Australian Navy at age 17 to serve in the Second World War and went on to become a commander of the Royal Australian Navy Reserve and an honorary colonel of the Australian Army Reserve. Beyond his judicial career, Sir Laurence was a prolific mediator, as well as becoming the chairman of Fairfax Media and a director of Banca Monte dei Paschi di Siena, the oldest bank in the world. Sir Laurence's sister Philippa "Pip" Street married the Australian Test cricketer John "Jack" Henry Webb Fingleton, . He had a state funeral at the Sydney Opera House Concert Hall in 2018.

Susan Gai Watt,  (formerly Lady Street; born 1932) was the first wife of Sir Laurence, a graduate of the University of New South Wales and the first female chair of the Eastern Sydney Health Service. She is the daughter of Ruth Edmunds Massey and Ernest Alexander Stuart Watt, niece of the aviator Walter Oswald Watt, granddaughter of the politician John Brown Watt and great-granddaughter of the politician George Kenyon Holden.

Anthony Austin "Tony" Street,  (1926–2022), the son of Geoffrey Austin Street, also represented the seat of Corangamite, from 1966 to 1983. A naval veteran of the Second World War, he was Australia's Foreign Minister in the Fourth Fraser Ministry, from 1980 until 1983. He had previously served in the Second Fraser Ministry and the Third Fraser Ministry as Minister for Industrial Relations and Minister for Employment and Industrial Relations.

Recent generations

Sir Laurence Street had four children by his first wife Susan, formerly Lady Street, namely Kenneth, Sylvia, Alexander and Sarah. Kenneth Street is a businessman with three children by his wife Sarah Street (née Kinross). Sylvia Emmett,  (née Street) is a federal judge and a lieutenant commander of the Royal Australian Naval Reserve. She graduated from Sydney Law School (LLB) and is married to Arthur Emmett, a federal judge and Challis Lecturer in Roman Law at Sydney Law School. Alexander "Sandy" Street,  is also a federal judge and a commander of the Royal Australian Naval Reserve. He has four children by two wives. Sarah Farley (née Street) graduated from Sydney Law School (LLB) and has four children by her husband, financier Gerard Farley. Sir Laurence's only child by his second wife and widow Lady (Penelope; née Ferguson) Street is Jessie Street, who graduated from Sydney Law School (JD) and is the god-daughter of King Charles III.

See also
 Dynasties (ABC documentary)
 Jessie Street National Women's Library
 Jessie Street Gardens
 Street House

References

 
Political families of Australia
Legal families of Australia